Charles Stanley (born 1932), is an American preacher, Pastor of First Baptist Church, Atlanta, Georgia.

Charles Stanley may also refer to:
Simon Carl Stanley (1703-1761) Danish sculptor known in England as Charles Stanley
Charles Stanley, 8th Earl of Derby (1628–1672), Lord of Mann 1660–1672
Charles Stanley (priest) (born 1884), Irish Anglican Dean of Lismore
Charles John Stanley (composer) (1712–1786), English composer
Charles H. Stanley (1842–1913), comptroller of Maryland
Charles Henry Stanley (1819–1901), American chess player
Charles Orr Stanley (1899–1989), Irish businessman, head of British company Pye Ltd
Charles Zedenno Stanley (1666–1715), English MP and Governor of the Isle of Man
Chuck Stanley, former drummer of popular beat combo The Ordinary Boys
 "Chuck Stanley", pen name of Charles S. Strong

See also
Charles Stanley Group, a British investment management firm